Morning Song may refer to:
 "Morning Song" (song), a song by Jewel
 Morning Song (David Murray album)
 Morning Song (George Cables album)
Morning Song, a song on the EP, Morning Songs by Jim Stark